William Dodge Havens, Jr. (January 29, 1919 – May 5, 2013) was an American canoeist who competed in the 1948 Summer Olympics.

References

1919 births
2013 deaths
American male canoeists
Olympic canoeists of the United States
Canoeists at the 1948 Summer Olympics